Ece Dizdar (born 23 November 1981) is a Turkish actress.

Life and career 
Dizdar was born in Istanbul. During her childhood, her father went on missions as a submarine worker and she moved with him to different cities across Turkey and stayed in countries such as Pakistan, Belgium, and the UK. She usually studied at DoDDS American schools where she traveled. During her secondary school years, she studied musicals and dance in Belgium, and appeared on the stage by joining the children's conservatory for 2 years. After graduating from Marmara University Faculty of Communication, she moved to London, completed her acting education at the ARTSED acting academy with a scholarship and started her professional acting career. Ece Dizdar translated plays such as Shopping and F… ing and Festen for Dot Theatre. She later worked as a voice actress for professional commercials and promotional works. She then continued her stage career in Turkey and England, and soon appeared in television and cinematic productions.

Dizdar first became known through her role in the 2002 En Son Babalar Duyar TV series. She continued her career in TV with a role in the 2003 TV series Esir Şehrin Gözyaşları. After appearing in the TV series Hayalet in 2004, she took a break from acting. She returned to TV screens in 2011 after being cast in the series Karakol. In 2012, she played the role of Yeşim in the TV series Şubat. She then portrayed the character of Melda in the series Güneşi Beklerken and in 2015 appeared as Şevval in the series Beş Kardeş.

Theatre 
 Yutmak, Craft Theatre, 2017
 Altın Ejderha, Dot Theatre, 2012–2013
 İki Kişilik Bir Oyun, İKSV Salon-Dot Theatre, director: Bülent Erkmen
 Shopping And F…ing, Dot Theatre, director: Murat Daltaban, 2009–2011
 Vur/Yağmala/Yeniden, Dot Theatre, director: Murat Daltaban, 2009
 Kız Tavlama Sanatı, Talimhane Theatre, director: Mehmet Ergen, 2008
 My Name İs Red, BBC Radio Theatre, director: John Dryden, 2008
 Startle Response, Young VIC Theatre, director: Samantha Ellis, 2007
 Sugar And Snow, BBC-Radio 4 Theatre, 2006
 Birds Without Wings, Eastern Angles Theatre, director: Ivan Cutting, 2006
 Leyla, National Theatre Studios, director: Robin Hooper, 2005
 Release The Beat, Arcola Theatre, director: Mehmet Ergen, 2004
 Pof ve Paf, Istanbul State Theatre, 2003

Filmography

Film 
 2019 - Aşk, Büyü vs. - director: Ümit Ünal
 2019 - Küçük Şeyler - director: Kıvanç Sezer
 2013 - Çekmeceler - director: Mehmet Binay, Caner Alper
 2007 - Getting It On - director: Chris Menaul
 2005 - Percy Circus - director: Kenny Strickland
 2004 - Simbiyotik

Television 
 2022 - Gizli Saklı (Nehir)
 2021–2022 - Yasak Elma (Feyza) 
 2021 – Menajerimi Ara (herself / guest appearance)
 2017–2018 - Siyah Beyaz Aşk (İdil)
 2016 - Arkadaşlar İyidir (Leyla)
 2015 - Beş Kardeş (Şevval)
 2013 - Güneşi Beklerken (Melda)
 2012 - Şubat (Yeşim)
 2011 - Karakol (Dicle)
 2004 - Hayalet (Funda)
 2003 - Esir Şehrin Gözyaşları (Patrick's wife)
 2002 - En Son Babalar Duyar

Web series 
 2021 - Yetiş Zeynep (Beril)
 2020 - Alef
 2017 - Görünen Adam (Zühtü)
 2017 - Fi (Nazlı)

Awards 
21st Sadri Alışık Theatre and Cinema Awards: Most Successful Actress of the Year (Drama) (Çekmeceler)
39th Istanbul Film Festival: Best Actress (Aşk, Büyü vs.)

References

External links 
 

Living people
1979 births
Actresses from Istanbul
Turkish voice actresses
Turkish film actresses
Turkish stage actresses
Turkish television actresses